Pultenaea robusta is a species of flowering plant in the family Fabaceae and is endemic to eastern Australia. It is an erect shrub with hairy branches, linear leaves, and yellow to orange and red to purple, pea-like flowers.

Description
The flowers are arranged in dense clusters on the ends of branches with papery, scale-like, pale brown to yellow bracts at the base.

Taxonomy and naming
This pea was first formally described in 1920 by Herbert Bennett Williamson who gave it the name Pultenaea paleacea var. robusta in the Proceedings of the Royal Society of Victoria from specimens collected near Gympie. In 2004, Rogier Petrus Johannes de Kok raised the variety to species status as Pultenaea robusta in Australian Systematic Botany.

Distribution and habitat
This pultenaea grows in forest, heath or swampland from Wide Bay in Queensland to near Tweed Heads in far north-eastern New South Wales.

References

robusta
Flora of New South Wales
Flora of Queensland
Plants described in 1920